Percolaus is a genus of beetles in the family Carabidae, containing the following species:

 Percolaus championi Bates, 1882
 Percolaus guillermo (Ball & Roughley, 1982)

References

Pterostichinae